Garrett Michael Cullity is an Australian philosopher and Professor of Philosophy at Australian National University. He was Hughes Professor of Philosophy at the University of Adelaide between 2007 and 2020.
He is known for his research on moral philosophy.
Cullity is a Fellow of Australian Academy of the Social Sciences and Australian Academy of the Humanities, and a former president of Australasian Association of Philosophy (2012-2013).

Books
 Concern, Respect, and Cooperation, Oxford University Press, 2018
 The Moral Demands of Affluence, Oxford University Press, 2004
 Ethics and Practical Reason, co-edited with Berys Gaut, Oxford University Press, 1997

See also
Demandingness objection
Practical reason

References

External links
 Cullity's Personal Website
 Garrett Cullity at the University of Adelaide

Australian philosophers
Analytic philosophers
Philosophy academics
Living people
Year of birth missing (living people)
Academic staff of the University of Adelaide